Xinyi Planning District, also known as the Xinyi Planning Area, is located in Xinyi District, Taipei, Taiwan. The total area of the Xinyi Planning District is 153 hectares. It was designed in the 1970s and developed from the 1980s onward. Xinyi Planning District is the prime central business district of Taipei. Important infrastructure, such as Taipei 101, Taipei City Hall, Taipei International Convention Center and Taipei World Trade Center, is located within this area.

Historical Development 

Its historical development began in 1976, when the Taipei Municipal Government accepted the proposal to redevelop the area east of the Sun Yat-sen Memorial Hall. The goal of this redevelopment was to set up a secondary commercial center away from the more crowded old city center (Taipei Station, Ximending area). The redevelopment hoped to increase the prosperity of the eastern district and the convenience of urban life for existing residents.

The development framework was planned by the Japanese architect Guo Maolin, an architect with planning experience with the Nishi-Shinjuku, a previously planned development in Tokyo. The center's purpose was to expand business investment in the area and attract international financial services and technology firms. It also planned for residential development by building a completely new community. The Xinyi Planning District is the only commercial development area in Taipei with a wholly planned street and urban design. In addition to attracting corporations, it also features large retail spaces, department stores, and shopping malls.

There are currently 15 department stores in Xinyi Planning District, forming the Xinyi Commercial District. Department stores in the commercial district include Shin Kong Mitsukoshi Xinyi New Life Square (A4, A8, A9, and A11), Taipei 101 Mall, Vieshow Cinemas, ATT 4 FUN, Uni-President Hankyu Department Store, BELLAVITA, Eslite Bookstore, Breeze Xin Yi, Breeze Song Gao, Breeze Nan Shan, Neo19, and FEDS Xinyi A13. Taipei Sky Tower Mall is currently under construction and is scheduled to be completed in 2022. With at least 5 department stores in a mere 50-hectare site, Xinyi Commercial District is said to be the world's densest commercial district.

Main Buildings

Transportation

Rail
 Metro
Taipei Metro
Tamsui–Xinyi line: Taipei 101 / World Trade Center Station, Xiangshan Station
Songshan–Xindian line: Songshan station
Bannan line:Taipei City Hall Station, Yongchun Station
 Taiwan Railways Administration
Taiwan Trunk Line: Songshan station

Road 
Xinyi Expressway
Civic Boulevard
HuanDong Boulevard

See also 
 Eastern District of Taipei
 Urban planning
 Xinban Special District
 Xinzhuang Sub-city Center

Notes

References 

 
Central business districts in Taiwan
Planned cities in Taiwan